Andrew Buchanan (April 8, 1780 – December 2, 1848) was a member of the U.S. House of Representatives from Pennsylvania.

Andrew Buchanan was born in Chester County, Pennsylvania. He graduated from Dickinson College in Carlisle, Pennsylvania. He studied law, was admitted to the bar in 1798 and commenced practice in York, Pennsylvania. He located in Waynesburg, Pennsylvania, in 1803.  He served as a member of the Pennsylvania House of Representatives and in the Pennsylvania State Senate.

Buchanan was elected as a Jacksonian to the Twenty-fourth Congress, and as a Democrat to the Twenty-fifth Congress.  He served as chairman of the United States House Committee on Elections during the Twenty-fifth Congress.  He resumed the practice of his profession until his death in Waynesburg in 1848. Interment in Green Mount Cemetery.

Sources

The Political Graveyard
Greene Connections: Greene County, Pennsylvania Archives Project

Democratic Party members of the Pennsylvania House of Representatives
Democratic Party Pennsylvania state senators
Pennsylvania lawyers
People from Waynesburg, Pennsylvania
1780 births
1848 deaths
Jacksonian members of the United States House of Representatives from Pennsylvania
Democratic Party members of the United States House of Representatives from Pennsylvania
19th-century American politicians